Neotantra, navatantra (Sanskrit: नव, nava 'new'), or tantric sexuality, is a Western new religious movement partially based on Eastern spiritual traditions of Tantra. It includes both New Age and other modern Western interpretations of traditional Hindu and Buddhist tantras with an emphasis on their sexual elements. Some of its proponents refer to ancient and traditional texts and principles, and many others use tantra as a catch-all phrase for sacred sexuality, and may incorporate unorthodox practices. In addition, not all of the elements of Indian tantric practices are used in neotantra, in particular the reliance on a guru.

As interest in Tantra has grown in the West, its perception has deviated from the Tantric traditions. It was seen as a "cult of ecstasy", combining sexuality and spirituality to change Western attitudes towards sex. Hence for many modern readers tantra is now synonymous with "spiritual sex" or "sacred sexuality", a belief that sex should be recognized as a sacred act capable of elevating its participants to a higher spiritual plane.

As tantric practice became known in western culture, which has escalated since the 1960s, it has become identified with its sexual methods in the West.

History

Practitioners
Sir John George Woodroffe, also known by his pseudonym Arthur Avalon, was a British Orientalist whose work helped to unleash in the West a deep and wide interest in Hindu philosophy and Yogic practices. Alongside his judicial duties he studied Sanskrit and Hindu philosophy and was especially interested in Hindu Tantra. He translated some twenty original Sanskrit texts and published and lectured prolifically on Indian philosophy and a wide range of Yoga and Solo Tantra topics. Woodroffe's The Serpent Power – The Secrets of Tantric and Shaktic Yoga, is a source for many modern Western adaptations of Kundalini yoga practice. It is a philosophically sophisticated commentary on, and translation of, the Satcakra-nirupana ("Description of and Investigation into the Six Bodily Centres") of Purnananda (dated around AD 1550) and the Paduka-Pancaka ("Five-fold Footstool of the Guru"). The term "Serpent Power" refers to the kundalini, an energy said to be released within an individual by meditation techniques.

Pierre Bernard was a pioneering American yogi, scholar, occultist, philosopher, mystic, and businessman. He claimed to have traveled to Kashmir and Bengal before founding the Tantrik Order of America in 1905. He eventually expanded to a chain of tantric clinics in places such as Cleveland, Philadelphia, Chicago, and New York City. Bernard is widely credited with being the first American to introduce the philosophy and practices of yoga and tantra to the American people. Many teachers of this version of tantra believe that sex and sexual experiences are sacred acts, which are capable of elevating their  participants to a higher spiritual plane. They often talk about raising Kundalini energy, worshiping the divine feminine and the divine masculine, activating the chakras.

Guru Bhagwan Shree Rajneesh, later known as Osho, used his version of tantra in combination with breathing techniques, bio-energy, yoga, and massage in some of the groups at his ashram.  He is the author of many books on meditation, taoism, buddhism, and mysticism, and at least six on tantra. One of them is Tantra, The Supreme Understanding, in which he unpacks the verses of the "Song of Mahamudra", by Tilopa. In addition out of his discourses on the Vigyan Bhiarav (or Vijnaya-bhairava), the 112 practices for enlightenment resulted in the much longer The Book of Secrets.

Criticisms
Georg Feuerstein, a German Indologist who also trained in tantra, writes in the epilogue of his book Tantra: Path of Ecstasy:

Responding to criticism of modern Western Tantra, Geoffrey Samuel, a historian of Indian and Tibetan Tantra writes:

According to author and critic of religion and politics Hugh Urban:

Urban says he does not consider this wrong or false, but "simply a different interpretation for a specific historical situation."

See also

References

Citations

Works cited

Further reading

 Anand, Margot (1996) The Art of Sexual Magic.
 
 
 Douglas, Nik (1997) Spiritual Sex: Secrets of Tantra from the Ice Age to the New Millennium. New York: Simon & Schuster.
 Douglas, Nik; Slinger, Penny (1979). Sexual Secrets: The Alchemy of Ecstasy.  New York: Destiny Books, 
 Eden, Donna, Feinstein, D., & Myss, Caroline (1999) Energy Medicine. New York: Tarcher/G. P. Putnam's Sons.
 Gerber, R. (2001) Vibrational Medicine. Rochester, Vermont: Bear & Company.
 Goodchild, V. (2001) Eros and Chaos: The Sacred Mysteries and the Dark Shadows of Love. York Beach, Maine: Nicolas Hays.
 Lacroix, Nitya (2003) Kama Sutra:  A Modern Guide to the Ancient Art of Sex.
 Muir, Charles; Muir, Caroline (1990) Tantra: The Art of Conscious Loving, Mercury House Publishers.
 Odier, D. (2001). Desire: The Tantric Path to Awakening. Rochester, Vermont: Inner Traditions, 2001.
 Osho Rajneesh, B. S. (1975) Tantra, The Supreme Understanding.  
 Osho Rajneesh, B. S. (1976) Meditation: The Art of Ecstasy. New York: Harper and Row, 1976.
 Osho Rajneesh, B. S. (1976) The Tantra Experience: Discourses on the Royal Song of Saraha (2 volumes). Cologne, Germany: Rebel Publishing Company.
 Ramsdale, David; Gentry, Cynthia W. (2004) Red Hot Tantra: Erotic Secrets of Red Tantra for Intimate, Soul-to-Soul Sex and Ecstatic, Enlightened Orgasms, Quiver Publishing.
 Saraswati, Satyananda  (2003) Kundalini Tantra. Munger, India: Yoga Publications Trust.
 Sarita, M. A.; Geho, S. A. (2001) Tantric Love. New York: Simon & Schuster.
 Stubbs, K. R. (1999) The Essential Tantra: A Modern Guide to Sacred Sexuality. New York: Tarcher/Putnam.

 
Human sexuality